BrainDead is an American political satire science fiction comedy-drama television series created by Robert and Michelle King. The series stars Mary Elizabeth Winstead as Laurel Healy, a documentary film-maker who takes a job working for her brother Luke (Danny Pino), a U.S. Senator, when the funding for her latest film falls through. Assigned as his new constituency caseworker, she discovers that Washington, D.C. has been invaded by extraterrestrial insects which are eating the brains and taking control of people, including members of Congress and their staffers. Much of the internal comedy of the series was that, in the altered reality of Washington, D.C. politics, only a few people noticed.

CBS announced a 13-episode straight-to-series order on July 22, 2015. The show premiered on June 13, 2016. After four episodes, the show moved from its Monday timeslot to Sundays to make room for the network's coverage of the Republican and Democratic National Conventions. The show had a planned four-season arc, which would have seen the bugs then invade Wall Street, Silicon Valley and Hollywood, but on October 17, 2016, CBS cancelled the series after one season.

Premise
The series centers on the Capitol in Washington, D.C., where alien bugs infect members of Congress.

Documentary filmmaker Laurel Healy agrees to take a job working for her brother, Democratic Senator Luke Healy, in order to secure funding for her next film. However, she comes across a conspiracy in which alien bugs have partially replaced the brains of several people, including members of Congress. Sometimes, the bugs cause their victims' heads to explode. The song "You Might Think" by The Cars is used frequently in the series as a leitmotif for characters who are infected by the aliens.

Cast

Main
 Mary Elizabeth Winstead as Laurel Healy, a documentary filmmaker who takes a job as a constituency caseworker working for her brother, Senator Luke Healy, and stumbles across the bug conspiracy
 Danny Pino as U.S. Senator Luke Healy (D-Md.), Laurel's brother, who is the Senate Majority Whip
 Tony Shalhoub as U.S. Senator Raymond "Red" Wheatus (R-Md.), a Republican Senator who is one of the first people to have their brains eaten and replaced by the aliens
 Aaron Tveit as Gareth Ritter, a staffer for Senator Wheatus who befriends Laurel, despite their extremely different political beliefs
 Nikki M. James as Dr. Rochelle Daudier, a medical doctor who befriends Laurel and Gustav and helps them uncover the bug conspiracy
 Jan Maxwell as U.S. Senator Ella Pollack (D-Ca)
 Johnny Ray Gill as Gustav Triplett a.k.a. Dr. Bob, a pseudo-scientist and conspiracist  who has discovered the existence of the aliens and how they communicate
 Charlie Semine as FBI agent Anthony Onofrio

Recurring
 Paige Patterson as Scarlett Pierce, Senator Healy's Chief of Staff and one of his mistresses 
 Megan Hilty as Misty Alise, a conservative political television commentator 
 Beth Malone as Claudia Monarch, a liberal political television commentator
 Zach Grenier as Dean Healy, former U.S. Senator and father of Laurel and Luke
 Brooke Adams as U.S. Senator Diane Vaynerchuk
 Wayne Duvall as U.S. Senator Andre Amarant, Republican Leader in the Senate
 Glenn Fleshler as FBI Agent Aaron Blades, Onofrio's partner
 Patrick Breen as Cole Stockwell, a budget analyst hired by Luke
 Lily Cowles as Germaine Healy, Senator Luke Healy's pregnant wife

Guest
 Margo Martindale as Dr. Joanne Alaimo
 Michael Moore as himself
 Kurt Fuller as J.K. Cornish, FBI torturer
 Michael Gaston as Lawrence Boch, a special investigator
 Santino Fontana as Kevin, an infected who gets captured by Rochelle
Michael Potts as Dr. Daudier, a doctor conducting a joint operation with the Russian Institute on the retrieval of a meteor

Production 
Singer-songwriter Jonathan Coulton wrote and performed musical recap segments of previous episodes, shown during the cold opening of each episode. There were exceptions to this, however: one episode instead opened with a parody commercial for "Space Bugs" in the style of prescription drug commercials in the musical style of the other recaps, while in another recap the singer, after admitting that the previous episode was too overwhelming to recap, recapped an episode of the western Gunsmoke instead.

Episodes

Broadcast
The series premiered in Australia on Monday June 20, 2016, on Eleven, part of the Ten network.

Reception
BrainDead has received generally favorable reviews. On Rotten Tomatoes, the series holds a 65% approval rating based on 49 critics. The site's critical consensus reads: "While admittedly uneven, BrainDead remains a charmingly idealistic sign of the political times". On Metacritic, the show holds a 61 out of 100 Metascore based on 37 reviews, indicating "generally favorable reviews".

On its cancellation, Robert King, the show's creator said, "It was a show that was trying to be as weird and anti-network as could be, and it was probably a mistake to do that on a network. But I loved that show."

References

External links
 
 BrainDead at CBS

2016 American television series debuts
2016 American television series endings
2010s American comedy-drama television series
2010s American political comedy television series
2010s American satirical television series
2010s American science fiction television series
CBS original programming
English-language television shows
Political satirical television series
Television series by CBS Studios
Television series by Scott Free Productions
Television shows set in Washington, D.C.
The Cars
Television series created by Robert and Michelle King